Universitet may refer to:
Universitet (Moscow Metro)
Universytet (Kharkiv Metro)
Universytet (Kiev Metro)

See also
University Station (disambiguation)